Johnson Creek is a stream in Thurston County in the U.S. state of Washington. It is a tributary to the Skookumchuck River.

Johnson Creek took its name from the Johnson Creek Lumber Company, which once was active near its course.

References

Rivers of Thurston County, Washington
Rivers of Washington (state)